
This is a list of the Areas of Special Scientific Interest (ASSIs) in County Antrim in Northern Ireland, United Kingdom.

In Northern Ireland the body responsible for designating ASSIs is the Northern Ireland Environment Agency – a division of the Department of Environment (DoE).

Unlike the SSSIs, ASSIs include both natural environments and man-made structures. As with SSSIs, these sites are designated if they have criteria based on fauna, flora, geological or physiographical features. On top of this, structures are also covered, such as the Whitespots mines in Conlig, according to several criterion including rarity, recorded history and intrinsic appeal.

For other sites in the rest of the United Kingdom, see List of SSSIs by Area of Search.

The data in the table is taken from the Northern Ireland Environment Agency's website in the form of citation sheets for each ASSI.

 Ballycarry ASSI
 Ballycastle, County Antrim Coalfield ASSI
 Ballygill North ASSI
 Ballymacaldrack ASSI
 Ballynanaghten ASSI
 Ballypalady ASSI
 Black Burn ASSI
 Breen Wood ASSI
 Caldanagh Bog ASSI
 Carey Valley ASSI
 Carrickarade ASSI
 Castle Point ASSI
 Castletown ASSI
 Church Bay ASSI
 Cleggan Valley ASSI
 Cloghastucan ASSI
 Cloghfin Port ASSI
 Copeland Reservoir ASSI
 Craigahulliar ASSI
 Craigs ASSI
 Culnafay ASSI
 Dunloy Bog ASSI
 Fair Head and Murlough Bay ASSI
 Feystown ASSI
 Frosses Bog ASSI
 Galboly ASSI
 Garron Plateau ASSI
 Garry Bog ASSI
 Garry Bog Part II ASSI
 Giant's Causeway and Dunseverick ASSI
 Glarryford ASSI
 Glenariff ASSI
 Glenariff Glen ASSI
 Glenarm Woods ASSI
 Glenarm Woods Part 2
 Glenballyemon River ASSI
 Glen Burn ASSI
 Gortnagory ASSI
 Inner Belfast Lough ASSI
 Kinramer South ASSI
 Larne Lough ASSI
 Leathemstown ASSI
 Lemnalary ASSI
 Linford ASSI
 Little Deer Park ASSI
 Lough Beg ASSI
 Lough Neagh ASSI
 Minnis ASSI
 Montiaghs Moss ASSI
 Newlands ASSI
 North Woodburn Glen ASSI
 North Woodburn Reservoir ASSI
 Outer Belfast Lough ASSI
 Portballintrae ASSI
 Portmore Lough ASSI
 Portmuck ASSI
 Portrush West Strand ASSI
 Ramore Head and The Skerries ASSI
 Rathlin Island - Coast ASSI
 Rathlin Island - Kebble
 Rathsherry ASSI
 Runkerry ASSI
 Sandy Braes ASSI
 Scawt Hill ASSI
 Sheep Island ASSI
 Slieveanorra and Croaghan ASSI
 Slievenacloy ASSI
 South Woodburn Reservoir
 Straidkilly Wood ASSI
 Tardree Quarry ASSI
 The Gobbins ASSI
 The Maidens ASSI
 Tievebulliagh ASSI
 Torr Head ASSI
 Tow River Wood ASSI
 Waterloo Bay ASSI
 White Park Bay ASSI
 White Rocks, Portrush ASSI

Notes
Rounded to one decimal place.

References

Areas of Special Scientific Interest in Northern Ireland

Antrim Borough
County Antrim-related lists